The 1958–59 Coppa Italia was the 12th Coppa Italia, the major Italian domestic cup. The competition was won by Juventus.

First round 

Replay match

p=after penalty shoot-out

Second round 
21 clubs are added (Modena, Bari, Atalanta, Cagliari, Catania, Como, Taranto, Messina, Novara, Palermo, Parma, Lecco, Pordenone, Hellas Verona, Prato, Brescia, Reggiana, Sambenedettese, Monza, Vigevano, Venezia).

Third round 
10 clubs are added (Alessandria, Roma, Internazionale, Napoli, Vicenza, Torino, Genoa, Triestina, SPAL, Udinese).

* The eliminated Alessandria are reinstated.

Fourth round

Round of 16 
8 clubs are added (Bologna, Milan, Fiorentina, Sampdoria, Juventus, Lazio, Marzotto Valdagno, Padova).

Quarter-finals

Semi-finals

Third place match

Final

Top goalscorers

External links 

 rsssf.com

Coppa Italia seasons
1958–59 domestic association football cups
Coppa